Dorcadion semiargentatum is a species of beetle in the family Cerambycidae. It was described by Pic in 1905. It is known from Iran.

Subspecies
 Dorcadion semiargentatum burdzushense Danilevsky & Murzin, 2009
 Dorcadion semiargentatum ortrudheinzae Danilevsky, 1998
 Dorcadion semiargentatum sarabense Holzschuh, 1993
 Dorcadion semiargentatum sementivum Danilevsky & Murzin, 2009
 Dorcadion semiargentatum semiargentatum Pic, 1905

References

semiargentatum
Beetles described in 1905